Drozdovka is a rural locality (a village) in Novoselskoye Rural Settlement, Kovrovsky District, Vladimir Oblast, Russia. The population was 11 as of 2010.

Geography 
Drozdovka is located 54 km southwest of Kovrov (the district's administrative centre) by road. Dmitriyevo is the nearest rural locality.

References 

Rural localities in Kovrovsky District